Jocelyne is a feminine given name. Notable people with the name include:

 Jocelyne (singer), (1951–1972), a French singer of the Yé-yé period
 Jocelyne Bloch, a Swiss neurosurgeon
 Jocelyne Boisseau, a French film and television actress
 Jocelyne Couture-Nowak (1958–2007),  the only Canadian victim of the Virginia Tech shootings
 Jocelyne Dakhlia (born 1959), French historian and anthropologist
 Jocelyne Gagné, a justice with the Federal Court of Canada
 Jocelyne Jocya (1942–2003), French singer and children's rights advocate
 Jocelyne LaGarde (1924–1979), a Tahitian who became famous for her one acting role in the 1966 motion picture, Hawaii
 Jocelyne Loewen, a Canadian voice actress
 Jocelyne Pérard (born 1940), a French geographer
 Jocelyne Roy-Vienneau (born c. 1956), the 31st and current Lieutenant Governor of New Brunswick

French feminine given names